Huasmin District is one of twelve districts of the province Celendín in Peru.

See also
 Mamaqucha

References